Oberonia complanata, commonly known as the southern green fairy orchid or yellow-flowered king of the fairies,  is a plant in the orchid family and is a clump-forming epiphyte. It has between three and eight leaves in a fan-like arrangement on each shoot and up to three hundred tiny cream-coloured or greenish flowers arranged in whorls around the flowering stem. It is endemic to eastern Australia.

Description
Oberonia complanata is an epiphytic, clump-forming herb. Flowering occurs between February and July.

Taxonomy and naming
The southern green fairy orchid was first formally described in 1839 by Allan Cunningham who gave it the name Dendrobium complanatum and published the description in Edwards's Botanical Register. In 1989 Mark Clements and David Jones changed the name to Oberonia complanata. The specific epithet (complanata) is a Latin word meaning "flattened".

Distribution and habitat
Oberonia complanata grows on trees and rocks in rainforest between Gympie in Queensland and Coffs Harbour in New South Wales.

Conservation
This orchid is classed as "endangered" in New South Wales under the Biodiversity Conservation Act 2016. It has recently been seen in the Lismore district and near Mount Warning but has not been seen near Coffs Harbour since 1961. The main threats to the species are land clearing, habitat degradation and illegal collecting.

References

complanata
Endemic orchids of Australia
Plants described in 1839
Orchids of New South Wales
Orchids of Queensland